Etta May is an American comedian.  She was the winner of the American Comedy Awards Stand-Up Comic of the Year, and has appeared on MTV, Oprah, Comic Strip Live, and as a guest commentator on CBS Sunday Morning.

Today, she is currently performing at sold out theaters and on tour with Etta May and the Southern Fried Chicks.

References

External links

The Free Library

Living people
American women comedians
21st-century American comedians
Year of birth missing (living people)
21st-century American women